Ricky & Barabba is a 1992 Italian comedy film directed by Christian De Sica.

Cast
Renato Pozzetto as Ricky Morandi
Christian De Sica as Barabba
Francesca Reggiani as Elena Salvetti Morandi
Franco Fabrizi as engineer Salvetti
Bruno Corazzari as Sandro Bonetti
Sylva Koscina as Cristina Bonetti
Marisa Merlini as Marisa, Barabba's mother
Stefania Calandra as Paloma
Giovanni Lombardo Radice as the Director of Relais Hotel

References

External links

Ricky & Barabba at Variety Distribution

1992 films
Films directed by Christian De Sica
Films scored by Manuel De Sica
1990s Italian-language films
1992 comedy films
Italian comedy films
1990s Italian films